Nepenthales (Nepenthales Bercht. & J.Presl)  is an order of carnivorous flowering plants in the Cronquist system of plant classification.

Cronquist system
The order was placed in the subclass Dilleniidae, which in the 1981 version of this system included: 

 order Nepenthales
 family Droseraceae
 family Nepenthaceae
 family Sarraceniaceae

All three families are carnivorous plant families. The Droseraceae contains three extant genera: Drosera (sundews), which catch insects with adhesive droplets, Dionaea (Venus flytrap),  which capture them in leaves with interlocking teeth, and Aldrovanda (waterwheel plant). The other two families include pitcher plants, which drown their prey.

APG IV system
Plant taxonomy systematists currently favor the APG IV system of 2016 over the older Cronquist system for classifying flowering plants (Angiosperms). 

The 2009 APG III system assigned the first two families to the order Caryophyllales and the last family to the order Ericales.

References

Carnivorous plants
Historically recognized angiosperm orders